MDX-1097 (also called IST-1097 or KappaMab) is a monoclonal antibody therapy being assessed in Phase IIb clinical trials as a treatment for multiple myeloma, a type of white blood cell cancer. It is a chimeric version of the mouse monoclonal antibody K-1-21. MDX-1097 targets kappa free immunoglobulin light chains which are found on the surface of some kappa light chain-restricted myeloma cells.

MDX-1097 was originally developed by scientists at Immune System Therapeutics Ltd. In 2015, Haemalogix Pty Ltd acquired the rights to MDX-1097 and are now taking it through late stage clinical testing.

References 

Monoclonal antibodies for tumors